The men's super heavyweight (+91 kg/200.2 lbs) Thai-Boxing division at the W.A.K.O. European Championships 2006 in Skopje was the heaviest of the male Thai-Boxing tournaments and involved eight fighters.  Each of the matches was three rounds of two minutes each and were fought under Thai-Boxing rules.

The tournament champion was Alexey Kudin of Belarus who defeated Croatian Valentino Venturini in the final by KO to win the gold medal.  It was a sweet victory for Kudzin who had been runner up at the last European championships in Budva.  Defeated semi finalists Mirko Vlahović of Montenegro and Mladen Bozic from Serbia took bronze.

Results

Key

See also
List of WAKO Amateur European Championships
List of WAKO Amateur World Championships
List of male kickboxers

References

External links
 WAKO World Association of Kickboxing Organizations Official Site

W.A.K.O. European Championships 2006 (Skopje)